Arms or ARMS may refer to:
Arm or arms, the upper limbs of the body

Arm, Arms, or ARMS may also refer to:

People
 Ida A. T. Arms (1856–1931), American missionary-educator, temperance leader

Coat of arms or weapons
Armaments or weapons
Firearm
Small arms
Coat of arms
In this sense, "arms" is a common element in pub names

Enterprises
Amherst Regional Middle School
Arms Corporation, originally named Dandelion, a defunct Japanese animation studio who operated from 1996 to 2020
TRIN (finance) or Arms Index, a short-term stock trading index
Australian Relief & Mercy Services, a part of Youth With A Mission

Arts and entertainment
ARMS (band), an American indie rock band formed in 2004
Arms (album), a 2016 album by Bell X1
"Arms" (song), a 2011 song by Christina Perri from the album lovestrong
Arms (video game), a 2017 fighting video game for the Nintendo Switch
ARMS Charity Concerts, a series of charitable rock concerts in support of Action into Research for Multiple Sclerosis in 1983
Project ARMS, a 1997 Japanese manga series also known as ARMS

Other uses
Alveolar rhabdomyosarcoma, a form of cancer
Arms, Amps root mean square, seen in electrical specifications often as the unit of current, Arms.

See also
 Arm (disambiguation)
 Armes (disambiguation)